In August 2022, violent protests and riots broke out in Sierra Leone. The protests were triggered by the nations cost of living crisis. A curfew was implemented in the capital city of Freetown. Thirty-one people died during the protests, including 25 civilians and six police officers.

References

See also 

 2022 in Sierra Leone

2022 protests
August 2022 events in Africa
2022 in Sierra Leone